Albert Latham (24 September 1904 – 1982) was an English footballer who played as a wing half for Accrington Stanley and Rochdale. He also played reserve team and non-league football for various other clubs.

References

Nottingham Forest F.C. players
Newark Town F.C. players
Wolverhampton Wanderers F.C. players
Accrington Stanley F.C. (1891) players
Rochdale A.F.C. players
Ashton United F.C. players
York City F.C. players
Barnoldswick Town F.C. players
Fleetwood Town F.C. players
Clitheroe F.C. players
Morecambe F.C. players
Lancaster City F.C. players
People from Hucknall
Footballers from Nottinghamshire
1904 births
1982 deaths
English footballers
Association footballers not categorized by position